The Roseland Academy is a coeducational secondary school with academy status, located in Tregony in the English county of Cornwall.

The school was established in 1963, and became a comprehensive in 1976. Previously a foundation school administered by Cornwall Council, Roseland Community College converted to academy status on 1 April 2011. The school continues to coordinate with Cornwall Council for admissions.

The Roseland Academy offers GCSEs, BTECs and OCR Nationals as programmes of study for pupils. The school also offers some vocational courses in conjunction with Truro and Penwith College and Cornwall College.

Notable former pupils
Jack Andrew, rugby player

References

External links
The Roseland Academy official website

Secondary schools in Cornwall
Educational institutions established in 1963
1963 establishments in England
Academies in Cornwall